Olivier Christophe Hervé Jean-Marie (19 November 1960 – 13 May 2021) was a French animator and director, best known for his work on Oggy and the Cockroaches, Space Goofs, and Zig & Sharko.

Jean-Marie died in 13 May 2021, having had cancer for some time.

Filmography

Television

References

1960 births
2021 deaths
Xilam
French film directors
French animated film directors
French television directors
Deaths from cancer in France